Nybelinella is a genus of blind cusk eels.

Species
There are currently two recognized species in this genus:
 Nybelinella brevidorsalis Shcherbachev, 1976
 Nybelinella erikssoni (Nybelin, 1957)

References

Aphyonidae